The 1999 Paegas Czech Open, also known as the Prague Open, was a men's tennis tournament played on outdoor clay courts in Prague, Czech Republic that was part of the World Series of the 1999 ATP Tour. It was the 13th edition of the tournament and was held from 26 April until 2 May 1998. Fifth-seeded Dominik Hrbatý won the singles title.

Finals

Singles

 Dominik Hrbatý defeated  Ctislav Doseděl, 6–2, 6–2
 It was Hrbatý's 1st singles title of the year and the 2nd of his career.

Doubles

 Martin Damm /  Radek Štěpánek defeated  Mark Keil /  Nicolás Lapentti, 6–0, 6–2

References

External links
 ITF tournament edition details

Prague Open
Prague Open (1987–1999)
1999 in Czech tennis